Polyakius is an extinct genus of Archostematan beetle belonging to the family Ommatidae. It is known from two species found in Cenomanian aged Burmese amber. It is considered to be a close relative of Omma.

References 

Burmese amber
Fossil taxa described in 2020
Ommatidae
Prehistoric beetle genera